Walter Ranghieri (born 1895, date of death unknown) was an Italian wrestler. He competed at the 1920 and 1924 Summer Olympics.

References

External links
 

1895 births
Year of death missing
Wrestlers at the 1920 Summer Olympics
Wrestlers at the 1924 Summer Olympics
Italian male sport wrestlers
Sportspeople from Milan
Olympic wrestlers of Italy